The Eighty-eighth Minnesota Legislature was the legislature of the U.S. state of Minnesota from January 8, 2013, to January 5, 2015. It was composed of the Senate and the House of Representatives, based on the results of the 2012 Senate election and the 2012 House election. The seats were apportioned based on the 2010 United States census. It first convened in Saint Paul on January 8, 2013 and last met on May 16, 2014. It held its regular session from January 8 to May 20, 2013, and from February 25 to May 16, 2014. A special session was held on September 9, 2013, to pass disaster aid legislation related to damage caused by storms and flooding in June 2013 and winter storms in April 2013.

Major events

 February 6, 2013: 2013 State of the State Address
 March 6, 2013: Joint session to elect regents of the University of Minnesota.
 April 30, 2014: 2014 State of the State Address

Major legislation

Enacted

 February 19, 2013: Medical Assistance expansion act
 March 20, 2013: Minnesota Insurance Marketplace Act
 May 9, 2013: Environment and natural resources trust fund appropriations act
 May 14, 2013: Civil marriage act
 May 22, 2013: Omnibus education act
 May 23, 2013: Omnibus jobs, economic development, and energy act
 May 23, 2013: Omnibus public safety act
 May 23, 2013: Omnibus health and human services act
 May 23, 2013: Omnibus agriculture, environment, and natural resources act
 May 23, 2013: Omnibus transportation finance act
 May 23, 2013: Omnibus elections act
 May 23, 2013: Omnibus legacy act
 Two appropriations line-item vetoed.
 May 23, 2013: Omnibus state government and veterans affairs act
 May 23, 2013: Omnibus tax act
 May 24, 2013: Affordable Care Act conformity and health plan market rules act
 May 24, 2013: Omnibus higher education act
 One appropriation line-item vetoed.
 May 24, 2013: "Homeowners' Bill of Rights" act
 May 24, 2013: Proposed constitutional amendment removing lawmakers' power to set their own pay
 Subject to voter approval on November 8, 2016.
 May 24, 2013: Omnibus transportation policy act
 May 24, 2013: Family Child Care Providers Representation Act
 May 24, 2013: Omnibus capital investment (bonding) act
 May 24, 2013: Campaign finance and public disclosure act
 March 21, 2014: Omnibus tax act
 April 9, 2014: Safe and Supportive Schools Act
 April 14, 2014: Minimum wage act
 May 9, 2014: Environment and natural resources trust fund appropriations act
 May 11, 2014: Women's Economic Security Act
 May 16, 2014: Outdoor heritage fund appropriations act
 May 16, 2014: Omnibus education policy act
 May 20, 2014: Omnibus capital investment (bonding) act
 May 20, 2014: Omnibus capital investment (general fund appropriations) act
 May 20, 2014: Omnibus supplemental tax act
 May 20, 2014: Omnibus supplemental appropriations act
 May 21, 2014: Omnibus health and human services policy act
 May 29, 2014: Medical cannabis act

Proposed
Boldface indicates the bill was passed by its house of origin.

 Civil unions substituted for marriage bill
 Civil unions bill
 Firearms regulation bill (/)
 Firearms regulation bill (//)
 "Homeowners' Bill of Rights" (/)
 Medical cannabis bill (/)
 Minimum wage bill (/)
 National Popular Vote Interstate Compact bill (/)
 Off-sale intoxicating liquor sales on Sunday bill (/)
 Omnibus capital investment (bonding) bill, 2013 (/)

Political composition
Resignations and new members are discussed in the "Changes in membership" section below.

Senate

House of Representatives

Leadership

Senate
 President: Sandy Pappas (DFL)
 President pro tempore: Ann Rest (DFL)

Majority (DFL) leadership
 Majority Leader: Tom Bakk
 Assistant Majority Leader: Katie Sieben
 Deputy Majority Leader: Jeff Hayden
 Majority Whips:
 Chris Eaton
 Lyle Koenen

Minority (Republican) leadership
 Minority Leader: David Hann
 Assistant Minority Leaders:
 Michelle Benson (until February 24, 2014)
 Roger Chamberlain
 Gary Dahms (from February 24, 2014)
 Paul Gazelka (from February 24, 2014)
 Bill Ingebrigtsen
 Warren Limmer
 Carla Nelson
 Dave Thompson (until July 3, 2013)
 Minority Whip: David Osmek (from March 13, 2014)

House of Representatives
 Speaker: Paul Thissen (DFL)
 Speaker pro tempore: Melissa Hortman (DFL)

Majority (DFL) leadership
 Majority Leader: Erin Murphy
 Majority Whip: John Persell
 Assistant Majority Leaders:
 Jason Isaacson
 Leon Lillie
 Diane Loeffler
 Carly Melin
 Kim Norton
 John Ward

Minority (Republican) leadership
 Minority Leader: Kurt Daudt
 Deputy Minority Leader: Jenifer Loon
 Assistant Minority Leaders:
 Steve Drazkowski
 Tara Mack
 Joe Schomacker
 Peggy Scott
 Paul Torkelson
 Kelby Woodard
 Minority Whip: Tim Sanders

Members

Senate

House of Representatives

Changes in membership

House of Representatives

Committees

Senate
 Capital Investment (Chair: LeRoy Stumpf, Vice Chair: Bev Scalze, Ranking: Dave Senjem)
 Commerce (Chair: James Metzen, Vice Chair: Vicki Jensen, Ranking: Paul Gazelka)
 Education (Chair: Patricia Torres Ray, Vice Chair: Kevin Dahle, Ranking: Carla Nelson)
 Environment and Energy (Chair: John Marty, Vice Chair: John Hoffman, Ranking: Dave Brown)
 Fish and Wildlife (Chair: Matt Schmit)
 Lands (Chair: Foung Hawj)
 Finance (Chair: Dick Cohen, Vice Chair: Bobby Joe Champion, Ranking: Michelle Fischbach)
 Divisions:
 E-12 Division (Chair: Chuck Wiger, Vice Chair: Alice Johnson, Ranking: Sean Nienow)
 Environment, Economic Development and Agriculture Division (Chair: David Tomassoni, Vice Chair: Foung Hawj, Ranking: Bill Ingebrigtsen)
 Health and Human Services Division (Chair: Tony Lourey, Vice Chair: Melisa Franzen, Ranking: Julie Rosen)
 Higher Education and Workforce Development Division (Chair: Terri Bonoff, Vice Chair: Greg Clausen, Ranking: Jeremy Miller)
 Judiciary Division (Chair: Ron Latz, Vice Chair: Barb Goodwin, Ranking: Warren Limmer)
 State Departments and Veterans Division (Chair: Tom Saxhaug, Vice Chair: Kari Dziedzic, Ranking: Roger Chamberlain)
 Transportation and Public Safety Division (Chair: Scott Dibble, Vice Chair: Susan Kent, Ranking: John Pederson)
 Legacy (Chair: Dick Cohen)
 Health, Human Services and Housing (Chair: Kathy Sheran, Vice Chair: Melissa Halvorson Wiklund, Ranking: Michelle Benson)
 Higher Education and Workforce Development (Chair: Terri Bonoff, Vice Chair: Greg Clausen, Ranking: Jeremy Miller)
 Jobs, Agriculture and Rural Development (Chair: Dan Sparks, Vice Chair: Matt Schmit, Ranking: Gary Dahms)
 Judiciary (Chair: Ron Latz, Vice Chair: Barb Goodwin, Ranking: Warren Limmer)
 Rules and Administration (Chair: Tom Bakk, Vice Chair: Katie Sieben, Ranking: David Hann)
 Committees (Chair: Tom Bakk)
 Conference Committees (Chair: Tom Bakk)
 Elections (Chair: Katie Sieben, Vice Chair: Kent Eken, Ranking: Scott Newman)
 Ethical Conduct (Chair: Sandy Pappas)
 Litigation Expenses (Chair: Dick Cohen)
 Permanent and Joint Rules (Chair: Tom Bakk)
 Personnel and Budget (Chair: Sandy Pappas)
 State and Local Government (Chair: Sandy Pappas, Vice Chair: Chris Eaton, Ranking: Dan Hall)
 Taxes (Chair: Rod Skoe, Vice Chair: Ann Rest, Ranking: Julianne Ortman)
 Divisions:
 Tax Reform Division (Chair: Ann Rest, Vice Chair: Lyle Koenen, Ranking: Dave Thompson)
 Transportation and Public Safety (Chair: Scott Dibble, Vice Chair: Susan Kent, Ranking: John Pederson)

House of Representatives
 Agriculture Policy (Chair: Jeanne Poppe, Vice Chair: Tim Faust, Lead: Rod Hamilton)
 Capital Investment (Chair: Alice Hausman, Vice Chair: John Ward, Lead: Matt Dean)
 Civil Law (Chair: John Lesch, Vice Chair: Susan Allen, Lead: Peggy Scott)
 Data Practices (Chair: Steve Simon)
 Commerce and Consumer Protection Finance and Policy (Chair: Joe Atkins, Vice Chair: Patti Fritz, Lead: Joe Hoppe)
 Controlled Substances and Synthetic Drugs (Select, established May 28, 2013) (Chair: Erik Simonson)
 Early Childhood and Youth Development Policy (Chair: Joe Mullery, Vice Chair: Carolyn Laine, Lead: Pam Myhra)
 Education Finance (Chair: Paul Marquart, Vice Chair: Linda Slocum, Lead: Kelby Woodard)
 Education Policy (Chair: Carlos Mariani, Vice Chair: Kathy Brynaert, Lead: Sondra Erickson)
 Elections (Chair: Steve Simon, Vice Chair: Laurie Halverson, Lead: Tim Sanders)
 Energy Policy (Chair: Melissa Hortman, Vice Chair: Will Morgan, Lead: Pat Garofalo)
 Environment and Natural Resources Policy (Chair: David Dill, Vice Chair: Peter Fischer, Lead: Tom Hackbarth)
 Environment, Natural Resources and Agriculture Finance (Chair: Jean Wagenius, Vice Chair: Andrew Falk, Lead: Denny McNamara)
 Ethics (Chair: Jim Davnie, Lead: Tim Kelly)
 Government Operations (Chair: Mike Nelson, Vice Chair: Mike Freiberg, Lead: Joyce Peppin)
 Health and Human Services Finance (Chair: Tom Huntley, Vice Chair: Kim Norton, Lead: Jim Abeler)
 Health and Human Services Policy (Chair: Tina Liebling, Vice Chair: Rena Moran, Lead: Tara Mack)
 Higher Education Finance and Policy (Chair: Gene Pelowski, Vice Chair: Zach Dorholt, Lead: Bud Nornes)
 Housing Finance and Policy (Chair: Karen Clark, Vice Chair: David Bly, Lead: Paul Anderson)
 Jobs and Economic Development Finance and Policy (Chair: Tim Mahoney, Vice Chair: John Persell, Lead: Bob Gunther)
 Judiciary Finance and Policy (Chair: Debra Hilstrom, Vice Chair: Carly Melin, Lead: Steve Drazkowski)
 Labor, Workplace and Regulated Industries (Chair: Sheldon Johnson, Vice Chair: Mike Sundin, Lead: Tim O'Driscoll)
 Legacy (Chair: Phyllis Kahn, Vice Chair: Leon Lillie, Lead: Dean Urdahl)
 Living Wage Jobs (Select) (Chair: Ryan Winkler)
 Public Safety Finance and Policy (Chair: Michael Paymar, Vice Chair: Paul Rosenthal, Lead: Tony Cornish)
 Rules and Legislative Administration (Chair: Erin Murphy, Vice Chair: John Benson, Lead: Kurt Daudt)
 State Government Finance and Veterans Affairs (Chair: Mary Murphy, Vice Chair: Jerry Newton, Lead: Bob Dettmer)
 Taxes (Chair: Ann Lenczewski, Vice Chair: Diane Loeffler, Lead: Greg Davids)
 Divisions:
 Property and Local Tax Division (Chair: Jim Davnie, Vice Chair: Ben Lien, Lead: Paul Torkelson)
 Transportation Finance (Chair: Frank Hornstein, Vice Chair: Connie Bernardy, Lead: Mike Beard)
 Transportation Policy (Chair: Ron Erhardt, Vice Chair: Sandra Masin, Lead: Linda Runbeck)
 Veterans Housing (Select, established April 19, 2013) (Chair: Jerry Newton)
 Ways and Means (Chair: Lyndon Carlson, Vice Chair: Tom Anzelc, Lead: Mary Liz Holberg)

Administrative officers

Senate
 Secretary: JoAnne Zoff
 First Assistant Secretary: Colleen Pacheco
 Second Assistant Secretary: Mike Linn
 Third Assistant Secretary: Jessica Tupper
 Engrossing Secretary: Melissa Mapes
 Sergeant at Arms: Sven K. Lindquist
 Assistant Sergeant at Arms: Marilyn Logan Hall
 Chaplain: Rev. Dennis Morreim

House of Representatives
 Chief Clerk: Albin Mathiowetz
 First Assistant Chief Clerk: Patrick Murphy
 Second Assistant Chief Clerk: Gail Romanowski
 Desk Clerk: Tim Johnson
 Legislative Clerk: David Surdez
 Chief Sergeant at Arms: Travis Reese
 First Assistant Sergeant at Arms: Amanda Rudolph
 Index Clerk: Carl Hamre

References

Notes

External links
 List of somewhat to very well-known bills compiled by the House Chief Clerk's Office
 List of bill summaries prepared by the House Research Department
 List of bill summaries prepared by the Senate Counsel, Research and Fiscal Analysis Office
 List of act summaries prepared by the House Research Department

 
Minnesota legislative sessions
2010s in Minnesota
2013 in Minnesota
2014 in Minnesota
2013 U.S. legislative sessions
2014 U.S. legislative sessions